Charles Spinasse (22 October 1893 in Égletons, Corrèze – 9 August 1979 in Rosiers-d'Égletons) was a French politician. He served as mayor of Égletons from  1929 to 1944 and again from 1965 to 1977. He belonged to the French Section of the Workers' International (SFIO). In 1938, he served as France's minister of budget.

1893 births
1979 deaths
People from Corrèze
Politicians from Nouvelle-Aquitaine
French Section of the Workers' International politicians
Democratic Socialist Party (France) politicians
French Ministers of Budget
Members of the 13th Chamber of Deputies of the French Third Republic
Members of the 14th Chamber of Deputies of the French Third Republic
Members of the 15th Chamber of Deputies of the French Third Republic
Members of the 16th Chamber of Deputies of the French Third Republic